Kalindu Siriwardana (born 3 January 2000) is a Sri Lankan cricketer. He made his Twenty20 debut on 6 January 2020, for Kurunegala Youth Cricket Club in the 2019–20 SLC Twenty20 Tournament. He made his List A debut on 28 March 2021, for Sri Lanka Air Force Sports Club in the 2020–21 Major Clubs Limited Over Tournament.

References

External links
 

2000 births
Living people
Sri Lankan cricketers
Kurunegala Youth Cricket Club cricketers
Sri Lanka Air Force Sports Club cricketers
Place of birth missing (living people)